The Birmingham and Midland Institute (popularly known as the Midland Institute), is an institution concerned with the promotion of education and learning in Birmingham, England. It is now based on Margaret Street in Birmingham city centre. It was founded in 1854 as a pioneer of adult scientific and technical education (General Industrial, Commercial and Music); and today continues to offer arts and science lectures, exhibitions and concerts. It is a registered charity. There is limited free access to the public, with further facilities available on a subscription basis.

History

Following the demise of the Birmingham Philosophical Institution, founded c.1800, which was wound up in 1852, The Birmingham & Midland Institute was founded in 1854 by Act of Parliament "for the Diffusion and Advancement of Science, Literature and Art amongst all Classes of Persons resident in Birmingham and the Midland Counties", as the council had rejected the Free Libraries and Museums Act 1850. The principal promoter of the project was Arthur Ryland, while others prominent in its establishment included George Dixon, John Jaffray, and Charles Tindal. The Institute commissioned architect Edward Middleton Barry to design a building next to the Town Hall in Paradise Street. The foundation stone was laid by Prince Albert in November 1855. With the building half-completed, in January 1860, the first public museum was opened in the Institute. Immediately the Council reversed its decision, and adopting the Act, negotiated with the Institute to buy the rest of the site. The other half of the planned building (up to Edmund Street) was completed by William Martin using the intended façade but redesigned behind. The municipal Public Library opened in 1866, but burned down during the building of an extension in 1879. Exhibitions of art were moved from the Institute to Aston Hall during rebuilding. In 1881 John Henry Chamberlain (architect and Honorary Secretary of the Institute) completed an extension to the Institute, in the gothic style.

When the premises at Paradise Street were demolished, in 1965 as part of the redevelopment of the city centre, the Institute moved to 9 Margaret Street. Margaret Street was originally the home of the private Birmingham Library, but it became part of the Midland Institute in 1956, when members voted for it to be subsumed into the Institute. The Birmingham Library premises were built in 1899 to the designs of architects Jethro Cossins, F. B. Peacock and Ernest Bewley, and is now a Grade II* listed building. A blue plaque on this building commemorates Albert Ketèlbey, who studied at the Birmingham School of Music when it was part of the Institute.

Charles Dickens was an early president after giving recitals in the Town Hall to raise funds. The Institute contains the 100,000 volumes of the Birmingham Library, founded in 1779.

In 1876, the subject of "phonography" (or Pitman shorthand) was introduced to the Institute. During the first session, Marie Bethell Beauclerc, the first female shorthand reporter in England, taught 90 students. By 1891, there were over 300 students, predominately male, attending her phonography classes.

A School of Metallurgy was set up in the Institute by G. H. Kenrick in 1875. This was spun-out from the Institute in 1895 as the Birmingham Municipal Technical School, now Aston University.

Weather recording

In 1837 A. Follett Osler (Fellow of the Royal Society) gave a presentation on readings taken by a self-recording anemometer and rain gauge he had designed. He was funded by the Birmingham Philosophical Institution to design instruments and record meteorological data. He gave instruments to the BPI and the Institute starting an almost unbroken record of weather measurements from 1869 (to 1954, date of source material). In 1884 the Institute leased Perrott's Folly, a 100-foot monument in Edgbaston, for use as an observatory. In 1886 the City of Birmingham Water Department allowed the Institute to erect instruments in an observatory on the nearby covered water reservoir. By 1923 a daily weather map was on display outside the institute. The Observatory was still in operation in 1954 (date of source material). The Observatory received funding from the City Council, and the Air Ministry at various times.

Affiliated organisations
Various independent societies are affiliated to the BMI including: 
The Birmingham Civic Society, The Birmingham Philatelic Society, Ex Cathedra, Institute Ramblers, Birmingham and Warwickshire Archaeological Society,  Midland Spaceflight Society, Workers Educational Association, Dickens Fellowship, The Birmingham and Midland Society for Genealogy and Heraldry, the Society for the History of Astronomy, The Victorian Society (Birmingham & West Midlands).

Presidents
The office of president is held by some person of eminence in the arts, sciences or public life. The presidential term usually lasts one year, but can be extended up to three years; and one of the presidential tasks is to deliver an inaugural address. In the early years, the president was usually a person of prominence in the West Midlands, but the election of Charles Dickens in 1869 raised the institute's profile, and it became the practice to invite a person of national renown to serve. The following is the list of presidents:

References

Sources

External links
 
 
 Birmingham City Council on BMI
 Birmingham Heritage on BMI

Clubs and societies in the West Midlands (county)
Grade II* listed buildings in Birmingham
Regional and local learned societies of the United Kingdom
1854 establishments in England
Organizations established in 1854